was a Japanese samurai of the Sengoku period. The onetime lord of Tatebayashi Castle in Kōzuke Province, he later became a retainer of the Utsunomiya clan.

External links
Information on the Kōzuke-Tatebayashi clan (in Japanese)

1548 births
1573 deaths
Samurai